Ragaciems is a village in Lapmežciems parish, Tukums municipality, south of Ragaciems cape in the Vidzeme region of Latvia. The village got its name from the nearby cape. Located between the Gulf of Riga and Lake Kaņieris by the highway P128, 3 km from the center of the parish Lapmežciems, 23 km from the center of the county Smarde and 52 km from Riga.

Gallery

References 

Gulf of Riga
Populated coastal places in Latvia
Tukums Municipality
Vidzeme